Onekawa Te Mawhai Regional Park is a protected area at Ōhiwa in the Bay of Plenty Region of New Zealand's North Island, owned and managed by Bay of Plenty Regional Council in partnership with the Upokorehe hapū.

The park covers 26.8 hectares, with views to Kohi Point in the west across Ohiwa Harbour, and east towards East Cape.

The park includes several culturally and archaeologically important sites to Upokorehe, including Onekawa Pā.

Features

Onekawa Pā is the central feature of the park. A 90-minute walking track leads through ancient puriri and other native bush to the top of the pā, and then through a working farm to Bryans Beach and back to the carpark.

A side track leads to a waterfall and glow-worms.

Horse trekking, camping, motorbikes, mountain bikes, fires, rubbish and unleashed dogs are banned to protect historic sites in the area. Bryans Beach is also a swimming spot during summer.

History

The Onekawa Pā has a long history of occupation, including by the leaders of Repanga, Kahuki and Tuamutu. The surrounding area has been the site of several battles.

Ringatū prophet and warrior Te Kooti Arikirangi Te Turuki settled in the area before his death in 1893.

See also
 Regional parks of New Zealand
 Protected areas of New Zealand

References

Protected areas of the Bay of Plenty Region
Ōpōtiki District